Excitatory amino acid transporter 2 (EAAT2) also known as solute carrier family 1 member 2 (SLC1A2) and glutamate transporter 1 (GLT-1) is a protein that in humans is encoded by the SLC1A2 gene. Alternatively spliced transcript variants of this gene have been described, but their full-length nature is not known.

Function 

SLC1A2 / EAAT2 is a member of a family of the solute carrier family of proteins. The membrane-bound protein is the principal transporter that clears the excitatory neurotransmitter glutamate from the extracellular space at synapses in the central nervous system. Glutamate clearance is necessary for proper synaptic activation and to prevent neuronal damage from excessive activation of glutamate receptors. EAAT2 is responsible for over 90% of glutamate reuptake within the brain.

Clinical significance 

Mutations in and decreased expression of this protein are associated with amyotrophic lateral sclerosis (ALS). The drug riluzole approved for the treatment of ALS upregulates EAAT2.

Ceftriaxone, an antibiotic, has been shown to induce/enhance the expression of EAAT2, resulting in reduced glutamate activity. Ceftriaxone has been shown to reduce the development and expression of tolerance to opiates and other drugs of abuse. EAAT2 may possess an important role in drug addiction and tolerance to addictive drugs.

Upregulation of EAAT2 (GLT-1) causes impairment of prepulse inhibition, a sensory gating deficit present in schizophrenics and schizophrenia animal models. Some antipsychotics have been shown to reduce the expression of EAAT2.

Interactions 

SLC1A2 has been shown to interact with JUB.

As a drug target 

EAAT2/GLT-1, being the most abundant subtype of glutamate transporter in the CNS, plays a key role in regulation of glutamate neurotransmission. Dysfunction of EAAT2 has been correlated with various pathologies such as traumatic brain injury, stroke, Amyotrophic lateral sclerosis (ALS), Alzheimer's disease, among others. Therefore, activators of the function or enhancers of the expression of EAAT2/GLT-1 could serve as a potential therapy for these conditions. Translational activators of EAAT2/GLT-1, such as ceftriaxone and LDN/OSU-0212320, have been described to have significant protective effects in animal models of ALS and epilepsy. In addition, pharmacological activators of the activity of EAAT2/GLT-1 have been explored for decades and are currently emerging as promising tools for neuroprotection, having potential advantages over expression activators.

DL-TBOA, WAY-213,613, and dihydrokainic acid are known inhibitors of the protein, and function as excitotoxins. They can be considered a novel class of nerve agent toxins, inducing toxic levels of glutamate through transport inhibition in a manner analogous to the effect of sarin on cholinesterase. Antidotes for such a poisoning have never been formally tested for efficacy and are not readily available for medical use.

Addiction to certain drugs (e.g., cocaine, heroin, alcohol, and nicotine) is correlated with a persistent reduction in the expression of EAAT2 in the nucleus accumbens (NAcc); the reduced expression of EAAT2 in this region is implicated in addictive drug-seeking behavior. In particular, the long-term dysregulation of glutamate neurotransmission in the NAcc of addicts is associated with an increase in vulnerability to relapse after re-exposure to the addictive drug or its associated drug cues. Drugs which help to normalize the expression of EAAT2 in this region, such as N-acetylcysteine, have been proposed as an adjunct therapy for the treatment of addiction to cocaine, nicotine, alcohol, and other drugs.

See also 
 Glutamate transporter
 Solute carrier family

References

Further reading 

 
 
 
 
 
 
 
 
 
 
 
 
 
 
 
 
 
 
 
 

Solute carrier family
Neurotransmitter transporters
Glutamate (neurotransmitter)